Khaznadar is a surname of Turkish origin, derived from a word meaning treasurer, and used mostly in Tunisia. Today, the surname is most prevalent in Algeria and Tunisia.

Notable people with this surname include:

 Maruf Khaznadar (1930–2010), Kurdish writer
 Mohamed Arbi Zarrouk Khaznadar (1760-1822), Tunisian politician
 Mohammed Khaznadar (1810-1889), Tunisian politician
 Mustapha Khaznadar (1878–1817), Tunisian politician

References